The Hattiesburg-Laurel Combined Statistical Area is a combined statistical area (CSA) in southern Mississippi that covers six counties: Covington, Forrest, Jasper, Jones, Lamar, and Perry. The CSA consists of the Hattiesburg Metropolitan Statistical Area and the Laurel Micropolitan Statistical Area. The 2010 census placed the Hattiesburg-Laurel CSA population at 247,233, though as of 2019, it was estimated to have increased to 253,330.

References

Combined statistical areas of the United States
Regions of Mississippi